Susan Brantly is an American scholar in Scandinavian literature and a professor at the University of Wisconsin–Madison.

Career
Susan Brantly received her Bachelor of Arts Degree in German and Scandinavian from Harvard University in 1980, her Master of Arts Degree in Scandinavian Literature from the University of Minnesota in 1983, and her Ph.D. in Germanic Languages and Literature from Yale University in 1987. That same year, she began working in the Scandinavian Studies Department at the University of Wisconsin, where she is currently a professor. Contemporary Swedish historical fiction remains a central research interest, and she has published articles on writers such as P.C. Jersild, Sven Delblanc, Sara Lidman, Per Anders Fogelström, P.O. Enquist and others in journals such as, Clio, Comparative Literature, Scandinavian Studies, Horizont. She has also published on August Strindberg and other nineteenth-century Nordic writers, and maintains a keen interest in modernist studies.

From 2007 to 2009, she served as president of the Society for the Advancement of Scandinavian Study. She has also served as the director of the Bradley Learning Community and the director of the Center for European Studies at the University of Wisconsin-Madison.

Brantly is the editor of the Studies in Nordic Literature and Film series, published by the Welsh Academic Press.  In 2013, Brantly became the editor of Scandinavian Studies, the quarterly journal published by the Society for the Advancement of Scandinavian Study.

Awards
2003 recipient of the Chancellor's Distinguished Teaching Award at University of Wisconsin-Madison
2004 recipient of Outstanding Faculty Member by The UW Panhellenic Association
2013 recipient of UW System Alliant Energy Underkofler Excellence in Teaching Award, 2013

Works

 (Trans. Albert Burkhardt) 
 (ed. with Thomas A. DuBois)
Brantly, Susan (2017). The Historical Novel, Transnationalism, and the Postmodern Era: Presenting the Past. New York: Routledge. ISBN 9781138230255

References

Scandinavian studies scholars
Academic journal editors
Year of birth missing (living people)
Place of birth missing (living people)
Living people
University of Wisconsin–Madison faculty
Harvard College alumni
University of Minnesota College of Liberal Arts alumni
Yale Graduate School of Arts and Sciences alumni
Society for the Advancement of Scandinavian Study